The Heroin Diaries may refer to:

The Heroin Diaries: A Year in the Life of a Shattered Rock Star, a book by Nikki Sixx
The Heroin Diaries Soundtrack, an album by Sixx's band Sixx:A.M.
The Heroin Diaries - X-Mas In Hell, an EP by Sixx:A.M.
"Heroin Diaries", a song by Ligeia from Bad News